This is a table containing the figures from the WHO Influenza A Situation Updates issued in July 2009 roughly three times a week, and, since 15 July, figures from ECDC.  The table can by sorted by country, date of first confirmed case or date of first confirmed case by continent.

This presentation of the data in this and other tables may show the progression, peaks, and, eventually, decline of the epidemic in each country and continent.

Note that no global report has been issued by WHO since 6 July - the data on 8 July was compiled from the reports of each of WHO's six regions, and since 15 July has been taken from ECDC.

Summary tables | Previous month | Next month

Confirmed cases

Deaths

References

July 2009